South Natuna (Indonesian: Natuna Selatan) is an archipelago off the west coast of the island of Borneo, the southernmost group of the Natuna Islands in the South China Sea. Geographically it is part of the Tudjuh Archipelago, and administratively part of the Riau Islands province of Indonesia.

The archipelago is spread out over hundreds of kilometers. Major islands include Greater Subi Island (Pulau Subi Besar), Lesser Subi Island (Pulau Subi Kecil), Bakau, Panjang and Serasan. The Api Passage separates the South Natuna group from the island of Borneo. The Selasan Strait cuts through the bottom of the cluster of islands.

Further reading

 National Geospatial-intelligence Agency (2005) "Borneo: Northwest Coast and Kepulauan Tudjuh" Sailing directions (enroute): Borneo, Jawa, Sulawesi, and Nusa Tenggara United States National Geospatial-Intelligence Agency

Natuna Regency
Archipelagoes of Indonesia
Landforms of the Riau Islands
Islands of Sumatra
Uninhabited islands of Indonesia